Bargadwa is a village in Pachperwa block, Balrampur district, Uttar Pradesh, India.

In 2011, the total population of this village was 7130 (3746 males and 3384 females). There is one bank, Allahabad Bank, upon exiting this village.

See also 

 Basantpur, Pachperwa
 Ganeshpur, Pachperwa

References 

Villages in Balrampur district, Uttar Pradesh